The women's 1500 metres race of the 2014–15 ISU Speed Skating World Cup 1, arranged in the Meiji Hokkaido-Tokachi Oval, in Obihiro, Japan, was held on 16 November 2014.

Ireen Wüst of the Netherlands won, followed by Marrit Leenstra of the Netherlands in second place, and Yuliya Skokova of Russia in third place. Li Qishi of China won Division B.

Results
The race took place on Sunday, 16 November, with Division B scheduled in the morning session, at 10:35, and Division A scheduled in the afternoon session, at 14:30.

Division A

Division B

References

Women 1500
1